A safeword, as used in sports, is a code word used by a player to avoid impending injury.

In certain contact sports, such as rugby and professional wrestling, when a player feels an opposing player's actions will cause the player serious injury, the player may utter a safeword to tell the opponent to stop the actions.

Professional rugby union footballers recognize the safeword "neck". A player may say "neck" during a scrum due to fear of a possible neck injury.  Players on both teams will recognize this and immediately release any downward pressure.

A more common example is "matte" (pronounced "mah-teh", meaning "Wait!") in most Japanese martial arts, including judo, which indicates surrender, usually due to an arm lock or a choke. In professional competition, saying "stop" or "help" does not indicate surrender and the opponent may continue combat. In catch wrestling and early competitive professional wrestling, a wrestler would say "uncle" when put in a submission hold to signify that they give up. This has largely been replaced by the more popular "tapping out" that is often performed by visibly tapping the floor or the opponent with the hand as seen in mixed martial arts.

See also
 Submission (combat sports)

Sports terminology